The 2020–21 Eredivisie Vrouwen is the eleventh season of the Netherlands women's professional football league. Twente started the season as defending champions.

Format 
At the regular season, the eight teams play each other twice (once at home and once away), for a total of 14 matches each. After that the top four teams qualify for a championship play-off and the bottom four teams play a placement play-off. In each play-off, teams played each other twice for a total of 6 matches each. Points accumulated at the regular season are halved and added to the points of the play-off stage rounds. There is no relegation nor promotion in the league and the champion and runner-up qualify for the 2021–22 UEFA Women's Champions League.

Teams

Regular season

Standings

Results

Play-offs

Championship play-offs

Standings

Results

Placement play-offs

Standings

Results

Statistics

Top scorers

Hat-tricks(+)

Top assists

References

External links 
 Official website
 Season on soccerway.com

Eredivisie (women) seasons
Netherlands
2020–21 in Dutch women's football